"My Bad" is the premiere of the fifth season of the Showtime series Dexter and the show's forty-ninth episode overall. It was written by Chip Johannessen, the show's former executive producer and showrunner, and directed by Steve Shill. It originally aired on September 26, 2010.
It brings the final resolution to the Trinity Killer plot that was present in season four and also features the last performance by Julie Benz as Rita.

Plot
Immediately after discovering his wife Rita murdered in their bathtub, a victim of the Trinity Killer, Dexter Morgan sits on his front lawn in a state of shock, while holding his infant son Harrison in his arms. The police, along with Debra, arrive at the house, but Dexter barely registers it, and only responds by whispering "It was me", as he blames himself for not killing Arthur Mitchell when he first had the chance, but this comment attracts the suspicion of the FBI, who have also arrived at the scene. Seeing as the murder is the work of the Trinity Killer, LaGuerta announces that Miami Metro must hand over the case to the FBI, much to the resentment of most of the department, who feel that Rita's death has hit them close to home. Meanwhile, Dexter manages to regain his senses enough to notice that the spirit of Harry has failed to appear and give him advice. At the same time Quinn catches a glimpse of the neighbor, Elliot, in tears over the murder, and finds it puzzling compared to Dexter's relative lack of response.

Faced with the arrangements for Rita's funeral, and having to talk with the FBI and telling the bad news to Rita's children, Dexter walks around in an absent-minded state, while he reminisces about the first time he met Rita, leaving it to Debra to make all the arrangements. While she cleans the site of the murder together with Quinn, the emotional pressure gets to her, and breaking down in front of him, the two end up having sex. Meanwhile, Dexter breaks it to Astor and Cody, who have arrived home from a trip to Disney World with their grandparents, that Rita has been killed. Astor takes it the hardest of the two, and angrily accuses Dexter of failing to protect Rita and tells him "We are better off without you!" Meanwhile, Quinn, about to leave Dexter's house with Debra, talks to Elliot, and finds out about Dexter punching him for kissing Rita. He tries to tell this to LaGuerta, but she reprimands him, both for interfering with an FBI investigation and for suspecting Dexter.

Dexter, taking Astor's words to heart, decides to abandon the city, leaving Harrison in the care of Debra, and skipping out on his FBI interview and Rita's funeral. But as he sails out from the bay, he runs out of gas, and stops at a refuelling station. Being alone at the station with Rankin, an unpleasant, loud-mouthed customer who insults him, Dexter follows him to the bathroom, and kills him in a fit of rage. Harry's spirit appears before Dexter again, surprised by his sudden outburst of raw human emotion and tells him that it is okay to let his feelings out, which leads Dexter to break down in a primal scream. He realizes that he genuinely loved Rita, and returns to Miami to appear at her funeral, giving her a heartfelt eulogy before she is laid to rest.

Reception
On its original broadcast, "My Bad" attracted 1.77 million American viewers, up 16% from the season four premiere. A second broadcast at 11:00 p.m. garnered an additional 575,000 viewers, bringing the night's total to 2.34 million, making the episode the highest rated Showtime series premiere in 15 years and the most watched premiere in the show's history. The fifth-season premiere ranks as the top telecast for the network in 2010.

The episode received generally positive reviews from critics. The A.V. Club gave the episode an A− grade, stating "There's no real sense of where Dexter goes from here - unlike in the other seasons, the show doesn't introduce a major new arc or villain (outside of the FBI's obvious interest in the statement, "It was me") - but as a season premiere, this works fantastically. Dealing with a character's death, particularly when that character had worn out his or her welcome, can be a tricky proposition for a long-running show, but Dexter finds a way to do it that suggests the darkness just over the horizon and that there will be no redemption for this man. For as goofy as the show can play him, it hasn't forgotten that he's a force of pure destruction, and that's a relief".

References

External links

2010 American television episodes
Dexter (TV series) episodes
Television episodes about funerals